Events from the year 1687 in Denmark.

Incumbents
 Monarch – Christian V
 Grand Chancellor – Frederik Ahlefeldt

Events
 March  Adolph Esmit succeeds Christopher Heins as Governors of St. Thomas and St. John.
 9 July  The Copenhagen Royal Fire Brigade os founded.

Undated
 The Krudttårnet gunpowder magazine is constructed in Frederikshavn.
 Hofmarschall Henrik Ulrik Lützow's town mansion is constructed on Stormgade in Copenhagen.
 Abraham Salomon becomes the first rabbi in Copenhagen. From 1766 until 1795, around 1,500 Jews worshipped in a small synagogue until it burned down.

Births
 21 February  Prince William of Denmark, prince (died 1705)
 21 July  Lars Benzon, judge and landowner (died 1741)
 23 September  Adam Christopher Knuth, 1st Count of Knuthenborg (died 1736)

Deaths
 3 February  Bernhard Keil, painter (born 1624)
 17 March Dorothea Elisabeth Christiansdatter, princess (born 1629)

References

 
Denmark
Years of the 17th century in Denmark